Lourdes Eulalia Quiñones Canales (born 11 February 1953) is a Mexican politician affiliated with the PRI. As of 2013 she served as Deputy of both the LX and LXII Legislatures of the Mexican Congress representing Durango.

References

1953 births
Living people
Politicians from Durango
People from Durango City
Women members of the Chamber of Deputies (Mexico)
Institutional Revolutionary Party politicians
21st-century Mexican politicians
21st-century Mexican women politicians
Members of the Congress of Durango
Deputies of the LXII Legislature of Mexico
Members of the Chamber of Deputies (Mexico) for Durango